is a former Japanese racing driver who was a 2002, 2006 and 2009 champion in Japan's Super GT series in the GT500 category. Prior to the 1998 Formula One season he tested for the Jordan Grand Prix team. 
In 2002, Wakisaka raced the Toyota Supra GT with Akira Iida, in 2006 and 2009 Wakisaka raced the Lexus SC 430 with André Lotterer. He retired from driving after the conclusion of the 2015 Super GT Series season, becoming the team director of Lexus Team LeMans Wako's.

Wakisaka was also a regular presenter of Best Motoring and is brother to Shigekazu, who also competes in Super GT.

Media Appearances
Wakisaka made a guest appearance in Downtown no Gaki no Tsukai ya Arahende!!, driving a Lexus LFA around Fuji Speedway for the 2013 No-Laughing Earth Defence Force Batsu Game

Racing record

Complete JGTC/Super GT results
(key) (Races in bold indicate pole position) (Races in italics indicate fastest lap)

Complete Formula Nippon results 
(key) (Races in bold indicate pole position) (Races in italics indicate fastest lap)

Complete Japanese Formula 3 results
(key) (Races in bold indicate pole position) (Races in italics indicate fastest lap)

References

External links

Official website
Super GT official website
Speedsport magazine database - Juichi Wakisaka

1972 births
Living people
People from Nara, Nara
Japanese racing drivers
Japanese Formula 3 Championship drivers
Formula Nippon drivers
Super GT drivers
Toyota Gazoo Racing drivers
Mugen Motorsports drivers
Team LeMans drivers
TOM'S drivers
Nürburgring 24 Hours drivers
Porsche Motorsports drivers
Team Aguri drivers